Ivkova Slava is a 2005 Serbian film by Zdravko Šotra. It is based on the 1895 book by Serbian author Stevan Sremac. The film is in Serbian. The film was a smash hit in Serbia and Montenegro.

Plot 

Ivkova Slava is set in the southern Serbian city of Niš in the 19th century, after the liberation and immediately after the establishment of the railway line Belgrade - Nis. This movie is about Ivko, a man, who celebrates Đurđevdan with people across the city.

Cast 
Zoran Cvijanović as Ivko
Nataša Ninković as Paraskeva
Srđan Todorović as Smuk
Nikola Đuričko as Svetislav 
Anica Dobra as Sika

References

External links
 

2005 films
2000s Serbian-language films
Serbian comedy-drama films
Films based on Serbian novels
2005 comedy-drama films
Films set in Niš
Cultural depictions of Serbian kings
Films shot in Serbia
Films directed by Zdravko Šotra